Cannons is the second commercial studio album by American contemporary Christian singer Phil Wickham, released on October 2, 2007, the album is outpacing same week sales of Phil Wickham's debut with more than 40 percent of album sales in digital form.  He also debuted on Real Rhapsody’s top artists chart in the Christian/Gospel genre as well as on the Napster top artists chart.  In addition, Cannons was a featured new release for both Napster and Sony. The Album debuted at No. 16 on Billboard Christian Albums.

Track listing

Personnel 
 Phil Wickham – vocals, acoustic guitar, electric guitar, acoustic piano (11)
 Gabe Scott – dobro (5), lap steel guitar (5, 6)
 John Wickham – electric guitar (10, 11)
 Pete Kipley – programming, bass
 Joel Plotnik – drums (1, 3, 11)
 Jeremy Lutito – drums (2)
 Dan Bailey – drums (4–10, 12)
 Roy G. Biv String Vibe – strings (4, 11)
 Amelia Emery – backing vocals (5)
 Savannah Packard – backing vocals (8)

Production
 Pete Kipley – producer
 Mike "X" O'Connor – recording 
 F. Reid Shippen – mixing (1–4, 11, 12)
 Buckley Miller – mix assistant (1–4, 11, 12)
 Lee Bridges – mixing (5–8, 10)
 Tom Laune – mixing (9)
 Dan Shike – mastering
 Christian Rios – art direction, design, photography

Charts

References

2007 albums
INO Records albums
Phil Wickham albums